Hans Hartinger was a male Austrian international table tennis player.

He won a gold medal at the 1936 World Table Tennis Championships in the men's team event for Austria and the following year he won a bronze medal in the men's singles at the 1937 World Table Tennis Championships.

See also
 List of table tennis players
 List of World Table Tennis Championships medalists

References

Austrian male table tennis players
World Table Tennis Championships medalists